Niranjan Goswami is an Indian mime artist and stage director, credited by many with pioneering the art form of mime in India. He is the founder of Indian Mime Theatre, a group promoting the art of Mukhabhinaya (silent acting).

Career 
He started his career in the late 1960s with Bahurupi, a local theatre group, but later joined Rabindra Bharati University for a course in theatre. In 1976, he founded Indian Mime Theatre for promoting mime and has performed on many stages in India and abroad. He is a visiting professor at the National School of Drama (NSD) and many other theatre institutions. He received the Sangeet Natak Akademi Award in 2002. The Government of India awarded him the fourth highest civilian honour of the Padma Shri, in 2009, for his contributions to Arts.

References

External links 
 
 

Recipients of the Padma Shri in arts
Year of birth missing (living people)
20th-century Indian male actors
Indian theatre directors
Rabindra Bharati University alumni
Living people
People from Dhaka
Indian male stage actors
Bengali male actors
Recipients of the Sangeet Natak Akademi Award